Winogradskyella litorisediminis is a Gram-negative, aerobic and rod-shaped bacterium from the genus of Winogradskyella which has been isolated from sediments from the coast of Geojedo.

References

Flavobacteria
Bacteria described in 2013